Renovica is a village in the municipality of Pale-Prača, Bosnia and Herzegovina. According to the 2013 census, the village has a population of 39.

Demographics 
According to the 2013 census, its population was 39.

References

Populated places in Pale-Prača